Lauri Aleksanteri Lehtinen (10 August 1908 – 4 December 1973) was a Finnish long-distance runner, winner of a controversial 5000 m race at the 1932 Summer Olympics in Los Angeles.

Lehtinen ran a new world record in 5000 m (14:17.0) just a month prior to the Olympics, thus becoming a main favourite to the Olympic 5000 m title. In the final, the Finns Lehtinen and Lauri Virtanen led early. They managed to shake off all other competitors except Ralph Hill from the United States. Soon the race turned into a battle between Lehtinen and Hill. On the last lap, Hill tried to overtake Lehtinen. Seeing this, Lehtinen blocked his way, zig-zagging from one lane to the other to the great exasperation of the crowd.  At the finish, Lehtinen crossed first a mere 50 centimetres ahead. Although this was a common tactic in Europe, the American audience was unaccustomed to it, so they booed. Hill declined to file a protest. They both recorded an identical time of 14:30.0. This was the only Olympic race longer than 200 metres in which the top two finishers recorded identical times.

At the 1936 Summer Olympics, Lehtinen defended his title, but finished second, after his fellow countryman Gunnar Höckert.

In 1940, Lehtinen donated his Los Angeles gold medal to a soldier who had served with distinction on the Karelian Isthmus. Lehtinen's gesture was a mark of respect for Höckert, who was killed in action on the Isthmus.

In Kerkkoo village in Porvoo, there is a road named after him, "Lauri Lehtisen Tie."

References

External links 

 
 
 

1908 births
1973 deaths
People from Porvoo
People from Uusimaa Province (Grand Duchy of Finland)
Finnish male long-distance runners
Athletes (track and field) at the 1932 Summer Olympics
Athletes (track and field) at the 1936 Summer Olympics
Medalists at the 1936 Summer Olympics
Medalists at the 1932 Summer Olympics
Olympic gold medalists for Finland
Olympic silver medalists for Finland
Olympic gold medalists in athletics (track and field)
Olympic silver medalists in athletics (track and field)
Sportspeople from Uusimaa